Alexandre François Barbié du Bocage (14 September 1798 – 2 February 1835) was a French geographer and lawyer.

1798 births
1835 deaths
French geographers
Scientists from Paris
École Nationale des Chartes alumni